Police Women of Memphis is the third of TLC's Police Women reality documentary series, which follows four female members of the Memphis Police Department in Memphis, Tennessee.

Cast
 Officer Aubrey Olson - Aubrey is a single mom who put herself through college and is a six-year police veteran. She is always guaranteed to bring a smile along with her when on patrol. However, behind her light-hearted demeanor, there lies an officer who is determined to get the job done and isn't afraid to wield a gun that's as tall as she is.
 Officer Arica Logan - After trying many different jobs, ranging from flight attendant to waitress, Arica decided to become a police officer in her hometown of Memphis. With only 2 years on the force, Arica is a determined high achiever who prides herself on her fairness and excellent aim—she is one of the top guns in her class.
 Officer Joy Jefferson - Joy, who is married and a mother of two, grew up wanting to be a police officer ever since she was a child, even though she grew up in a part of town where most people feared the police. With that tough upbringing never far from her heart, Joy relishes the chance to police her old neighborhood and show the young women in the projects that they too can get out and make something of themselves.
 Officer Virginia Awkward - Virginia is married. She understands the impoverished neighborhood she patrols because she was raised there.  Criminals should not be fooled by Virginia's slight stature, vivacious personality and welcoming grin. In the streets, she's aggressive, confident and can handle the worst out there.

Episodes

References

2010s American reality television series
2010 American television series debuts
2010 American television series endings
English-language television shows
Television shows set in Tennessee
Police Women (TV series)
TLC (TV network) original programming
Women in Tennessee